Gravitcornutia nigribasana is a species of moth of the family Tortricidae. It is found in Brazil in the states of Minas Gerais and Bahia.

References

Moths described in 2001
Gravitcornutia
Moths of South America
Taxa named by Józef Razowski